Kinnaur Assembly constituency is one of the 68 assembly constituencies of Himachal Pradesh a northern Indian state. Kinnaur is also part of Mandi Lok Sabha constituency.

Members of Legislative Assembly

Election results

2022

2017

See also
 List of constituencies of the Himachal Pradesh Legislative Assembly
 Kinnaur district
 Kinnaur

References

External links
 

Kinnaur district
Assembly constituencies of Himachal Pradesh